William Smith was a private in the United States Army who received the Medal of Honor for gallantry in action at Chiricahua Mountains, Arizona Territory on October 20, 1869, during the Indian Wars.

Biography
William Smith was born in Bath, Maine in 1838 and enlisted in the United States Army in 1869.

He should not be confused with William H. Smith, who also received the Medal of Honor for gallantry in action in the same location on the same day.

Medal of Honor citation
Rank and organization: Private, Company G, 8th U.S. Cavalry. Place and date: At Chiricahua Mountains, Ariz., October 20, 1869. Entered service at. ------. Birth. Bath, Maine. Date of issue: February 14, 1870. 

Citation:

Gallantry in action.

See also
List of Medal of Honor recipients
List of Medal of Honor recipients for the Indian Wars
William Smith (Medal of Honor, 1864), a different recipient with this name

References

1838 births
Year of death missing
American people of the Indian Wars
United States Army Medal of Honor recipients
People from Bath, Maine
United States Army soldiers
American Indian Wars recipients of the Medal of Honor